The Kalkadoon Wars were a series of encounters between European colonists and the Kalkadoon people of Australia.

Europeans started settling in the Kalkadoons' homelands around 1860. At first relations were peaceful, but as numbers of new settlers increased, things became more hostile and the Kalkadoons eventually resorted to guerrilla war.

Battle Mountain
In 1884 the Kalkadoons killed five native police and a prominent pastoralist. The Queensland Government sent in heavily armed police and ended up fighting the Kalkadoon at Battle Mountain. The Europeans were ultimately victorious.

See also 
 Australian frontier wars

References

History of Indigenous Australians
History of Queensland
19th century in Queensland
1880s in Queensland